Central Aircraft Company Limited was a British aircraft manufacturer from its formation in 1916 to its closure in 1926.

History
The company was formed in 1916 as a subsidiary of the woodworking firm R. Cattle Limited. In common with other joinery companies during the First World War it turned to sub-contract manufacturing of aircraft components. In 1919 shortly after the end of the war the company produced two original designs, the Centaur IV and Centaur IIA. The aircraft were built at the company works at Kilburn, London. The first aircraft were flown from a field next to the factory, but later aircraft were test flown and operated from Northolt Aerodrome. Unable to sell the aircraft the company used the Centaur IV for joyriding and training. The last aircraft produced was the Sayers Monoplane, built for the 1922 Itford Hill gliding competition. The company closed in May 1926.

Aircraft designs
Central Centaur IV
Central Centaur IIA
Sayers S.C.W.

References

 The Illustrated Encyclopedia of Aircraft (Part Work 1982–1985). London: Orbis Publishing. 
 Jackson, A.J. British Civil Aircraft Since 1919 Volume 1. London: Putnam, 1974. . 
 Smith, Ron. British Built Aircraft Greater London. London: Tempus Publishing, 2002. .

External links
 Central – British Aircraft Directory

Defunct aircraft manufacturers of the United Kingdom
Vehicle manufacturing companies established in 1916